Hindu College is  a constituent college of the University of Delhi in New Delhi, India. Being founded in 1899, it is one of the oldest and renowned colleges of the country which was ranked 2nd nationally by National Institute Ranking Framework (NIRF) under Ministry of Human Resource Development (Government of India). It offers undergraduate and postgraduate programmes in sciences, humanities, social sciences and commerce.
It has also been awarded 'Star College' status for its Department of Biotechnology by the Ministry of Science and Technology (Government of India). The college has produced many notable alumni in the fields of Law, Economics, Science, Psychology, Business, Philosophy, Literature, Media, Cinema, Military, Sports and Politics. Notwithstanding its name, students from all religions are admitted to Hindu College.

History

Hindu College was founded in 1899 by Krishan Dassji Gurwale in the backdrop of the nationalist struggle against the British Raj. Some prominent citizens, including Rai Bahadur Amba Prasad, Gurwale Ji, decided to start a college that would provide nationalist education to the youth, while being non-elitist and non-sectarian. Originally, the college was housed in a humble building in Kinari Bazar, Chandni Chowk, and it was affiliated to Punjab University as there was no university in Delhi at that time. As the college grew, it faced a major crisis in 1902. The Punjab University warned the college that the university would disaffiliate the college if the college failed to get a proper building of its own. Rai Bahadur Lala Sultan Singh came to rescue the college from this crisis. He donated a part of his historic property, which originally belonged to Colonel James Skinner, at Kashmiri Gate, Delhi, to the college. The college functioned from there till 1953. When the University of Delhi took birth in 1922, Hindu College along with Ramjas College and St. Stephen's College were subsequently affiliated with the University of Delhi, making them the first three institutions to be affiliated with the university.

Hindu College was a centre for intellectual and political debate during India's freedom struggle, especially during the Quit India Movement. It is the only college in Delhi to have a students' parliament since 1935, which provided a platform to many national leaders including Mahatma Gandhi, Motilal Nehru, Jawaharlal Nehru, Sarojini Naidu, Annie Besant, Muhammad Ali Jinnah and Subhash Chandra Bose for motivating the youth. Responding to Gandhi's Quit India Movement in 1942, the college played a substantial role in India's freedom struggle and some of this college's teachers and students courted arrest. The college also closed its gates for several months.

Principals 
 B.B. Mookerji, 1899–1906
 N.N. Roy, 1906–1911
 P.B. Adhikari, 1911–1915
 S. Sen, 1915–1917
 N.V. Thadani, 1917–1928
 S.K. Sen, 1928–1934
 N.V. Thadani, 1935–1950
 A. Bhattacharya, 1950–1957
 R.N. Mathur, 1958–1964
 B.M. Bhatia*, 1964–1971, 1973–1980
 P.C. Verma, 1980–1995
 S.N. Maheshwari, 1995–1997
 Kavita A. Sharma, 1998–2008
 S. Choudhary, 2008–2010
 Vinay K Srivastava, 2010–2012
 Pradumn Kumar 2012–2014
 Anju Srivastava 2014–present

 
*Dr. B.M. Bhatia was on leave for two years, 1971–1973. During this period, Dr. P.C. Sood was the substituting principal.

Campus 
The college is spread across a 25-acre campus. It has one auditorium, a seminar room and maintains a playground and a sports complex. Basketball, cricket, and table tennis is organised under the supervision of the director of physical education. The college has physics and chemistry laboratories, NCC and NSS rooms, a computer room, a photocopier and a stationery shop. A Students' Centre offers a bank and a canteen.

Library 
Hindu College's library is among the oldest college libraries in the University of Delhi. It was set up in 1899, along with the foundation of the college. Also students as well as teachers can refer to various books in library.

Hostel 
Hindu College's boys' hostel is situated next to the sports complex of the college. It has 119 rooms enclosing four lawns with rose beds and hedges (charbagh style). The hostel provides residential facilities to about two hundred undergraduate and postgraduate male students. A common room provides the residents recreational facilities such as Carrom-board, chess, and a separate TV room apart from the newspapers and magazines. Due to its limited capacity, only highly meritorious college students get admission to the hostel. The college has start building a girls hostel in 2013. Currently, Girls'Hostel is known as Smt. Indu Punj Girls' Hostel. It has seat for 190 girl student.

Organisation and administration

Departments 
 Department of Botany
 Department of Commerce 
 Department of Economics
 Department of English
 Department of Hindi
 Department of History
 Department of Mathematics
 Department of Philosophy
 Department of Physics
 Department of Political Science
 Department of Sanskrit
 Department of Sociology
 Department of Statistics
 Department of Zoology
Department of Chemistry
Department of Physical Science – Chemistry
Department of Physical Science – Electronics

Academics

Rankings

Hindu College is ranked 2nd among colleges in India by the National Institutional Ranking Framework (NIRF) in 2022.

Student life

Student Societies 
Every department has its own society which is tasked with organising department-specific co-curricular activities. Ibtida is the dramatics society of Hindu College which performs both stage and street plays. It was formed by Imtiaz Ali while he was a student at the college.
The women's development cell of the college has been very active in gender sensitisation and after the scrapping of section 377 successfully led pride parades to create awareness about LGBTQ+ rights. Caucus lis the discussion forum of Hindu College and works as a mini think tank. It was founded in 2008 and organises group discussions, speaker sessions, roundtable discussions, runs an active blog on its website www.caucus.in and publishes a monthly magazine The Probe. Caucus also functions as the international cell of the college and is responsible for managing the international collaborations of the college. Recently, they have collaborated with King’s College London. The intellectual fest of Hindu College - Compass is also organised annually by Caucus and has hosted various eminent personalities in the past like Prof. Arvind Panagariya, Mr. William Dalrymple, Amb. Shivshanker Menon, Dr. Soumya Swaminathan, Mr. Shekhar Gupta among others. It is one of the most active societies of the college.

The Indian music society, Alankar, holds its annual festival Harmony every year. The English debating society, popularly known as the Debsoc, is representative of an inquiring and active intellectual life on campus. Debsoc is the only debating society at Delhi University to organise four major debates in an academic year.

The Science Forum is a group of diverse science enthusiasts dwelling in Hindu College.

The Symposium Society is the policy and deliberation forum of Hindu College, University of Delhi. The organization follows a ‘General Body’ structure, with the President and Vice-President at the core. Among its many activities the prominent ones are the Prime Ministerial Debate and Interviews, Hindu Darbar, Hindu Mock Indian Parliament (HMIP), and Hindu Policy Forum (HPS). Furthermore, the society promotes independent student journalism through its bimonthly publication- Hindu College Gazette. The publication also reviews and publishes opinions and analyses from scholars and writers from across the country. However, this society has become inactive lately.

Other societies include Abhyas - The Internship Cell; The Finance & Investment Cell; Abhirang, the Hindi Dramatic Society; Adhrita, The Indian Dance Society, that works to maintain culture and heritage and conduct the only dance fest of DU; Abstraction, the Fine Arts Society; Aria, the Western Music Society; Manthan, the Quiz Society; Srijya, the Contemporary Dance Society; Scribe: The Literary Society; Masque, The English Dramatic Society; Vagmi, the Hindi Debating Society; and Vivre, The Film and Photography Society, the Entrepreneurship Cell, or more commonly just Ecell.

Students’ Parliament 
The college has a Students' Parliament. The Hindu College Parliament is a unique student organisation in the country. All the students and teachers of the College are its members. The students elect the Prime Minister from amongst themselves at the beginning of the year. There is also a Leader of the Opposition. The Speaker of the Parliament is a teacher nominated by the Principal in his/her capacity as the President of the Hindu College Republic. The College Parliament is a forum for discussions on academic and other issues. It allocates funds to various societies. The parliament is in continuous operation since 1935. Members of the Cabinet of students' Parliament are elected by students. The students' parliament takes care of student demands.

In Popular culture  
Hindu college features prominently in the movie Rockstar where the protagonist Janardhan Jakhar [played by Ranbir Kapoor] studies during the early part of his life. The choice of location is not surprising, as Imtiaz Ali, the director of this movie, has been an alumnus of this college.

Notable alumni  

The alumni of Hindu College are called Hinduites.
Eenam Gambhir, The First Secretary in the Permanent Mission of India to the United Nations.
Roshan Abbas, presenter
Mira Aggarwal, politician; Mayor of Delhi
Imtiaz Ali, film director
Mirza Farhatullah Baig, Urdu writer
Siddhartha Basu, businessman
Rekha Bhardwaj, singer
Vishal Bhardwaj, film director and music composer
Shiv Panditt, actor
Tahir Raj Bhasin, actor
Manvinder Bisla, Indian cricketer
Bipan Chandra, historian and former professor of Modern History at Jawaharlal Nehru University
Abhishek Chaubey, film director
Brahma Chellaney, author; professor at Centre for Policy Research
Aakash Chopra, Indian cricketer
Tisca Chopra, actress
Deep Dasgupta, Indian cricketer
Prithvi Nath Dhar, Principal Secretary to Prime Minister Office, India
Gautam Gambhir, Indian cricketer
Leela Gandhi, Professor of English at University of Chicago
Papiya Ghosh, historian; Professor of History at University of Patna
Arnab Goswami, former Editor-in-Chief of Times Now and Chief Editor and Co-founder of Republic TV
Ajay Bijili, Founder and MD of PVR Cinemas
Sanjeev Goyal, economist; Professor of Economics at University of Cambridge
Ajay Jadeja, Indian cricketer
Pema Khandu, Chief Minister of Arunachal Pradesh
Ashish Kothari, environmentalist
Amitava Kumar, journalist, professor of English at Vassar College
Manoj Kumar, actor
Mayanti Langer, journalist
Meenakshi Lekhi, national spokesperson of Bhartiya Janta Party
Ajai Malhotra, Indian Foreign Service Officer; Ambassador of India to Russian Federation
Kadambari Murali, Editor-in-Chief of Sports Illustrated India
Ila Patnaik, Principal Economic Advisor, Ministry of Finance of India
Hardeep Singh Puri, Cabinet minister, Indian Foreign Service officer; former Permanent Representative of India to the United Nations (2009–13)
Vinod Rai, 11th Comptroller and Auditor General of India and current Interim President of BCCI
Kavita Ramdas, President and CEO of Global Fund for Women
Arjun Rampal, actor
Mahesh Rangarajan, historian
Luv Ranjan, film director
Saqib Saleem, actor and model
Adarsh Shastri, former sales head, Apple Inc. India; political activist, MLA, Dwarka, NCT of Delhi, National Spokesperson, AAP of Aam Aadmi Party
Anil Shorey, Infantry officer in Indian Army; writer
Rana Hemant Singh, titular Maharaj Rana of Dholpur
Rao Inderjit Singh, Minister of State, India
Rao Narbir Singh, politician
Subramanian Swamy, economist, politician and former Minister of Commerce and Industry, India
Tabu Ram Taid, author
Sandeep P Parekh, securities and corporate lawyer
Loveleen Tandan, film director
Manish Tiwary, film director
Ashish Vidyarthi, Indian film and TV actor and theatre personality
Imran Zahid, actor
Nitin Tyagi, politician
Mallika Dua, comic and snapchat celebrity.
Jasleen Royal, singer-songwriter
Rakesh Ranjan Kumar, film director
Aditya Tamang, Indian politician, Member of Sikkim Legislative Assembly
Rajesh Talwar, writer and lawyer; works for the United Nations
Bhawani Shanker,#REDIRECT  Honorary Magistrate, Businessman and philanthropist

References

External links

 Hindu College website

Universities and colleges in Delhi
Educational institutions established in 1899
Delhi University
1899 establishments in India
Buildings and structures in Delhi
Hindu universities and colleges